London 3 South East is an English level 8 Rugby Union League involving club sides from Kent, East Sussex, West Sussex and the south-east London. It is made up of teams predominantly from London, Sussex and Kent. The twelve teams play home and away matches from September through to April.  Each year all clubs in the division also take part in the RFU Senior Vase - a level 8 national competition.

Promoted teams move up to London 2 South East and demoted teams move down to Sussex 1 and Kent 1.  Although 2nd XV rugby is part of the Sussex regional system, only 1st XV sides can play in London 3 South East.

Teams for 2021–22

The teams competing in 2021-22 achieved their places in the league based on performances in 2019-20, the 'previous season' column in the table below refers to that season not 2020-21.

Season 2020–21

On 30th October 2020 the RFU announced that due to the coronavirus pandemic a decision had been taken to cancel Adult Competitive Leagues (National League 1 and below) for the 2020/21 season meaning London 3 South East was not contested.

Teams for 2019–20

Teams for 2018–19

Teams for 2017–18

Teams for 2016-17
Ashford (relegated from London 2 South East)
Aylesford Bulls 
Eastbourne
Folkestone
Gillingham Anchorians
Haywards Heath  (promoted from Sussex Spitfire 1)
Lewes (promoted from Sussex Spitfire 1)
Old Dunstonians
Park House
Pulborough
Sheppey (promoted from Shepherd Neame Kent 1)
Thanet Wanderers (relegated from London 2 South East)

Teams for 2015-16
Aylesford Bulls (relegated from London 2 South East)
Bromley
Burgess Hill (promoted from Sussex Spitfire 1)
Cranbrook (promoted from Shepherd Neame Kent 1)
Eastbourne (promoted from Sussex Spitfire 1)
Folkestone
Gillingham Anchorians
Heathfield & Waldron 
Old Dunstonians
Park House
Pulborough
Uckfield

Teams for 2014-15
Bromley
Dartfordians
Folkestone
Gillingham Anchorians
Hastings & Bexhill
Heathfield & Waldron (relegated from London 2 South East)
Horsham
Lewes (relegated from London 2 South East)
Old Dunstonians
Park House
Pulborough
Uckfield

Teams for 2013-14
Ashford
Beccehamian (promoted from Shepherd Neame Kent 1)
Bromley
Burgess Hill (promoted from Sussex Spitfire 1)
Dartfordians
Folkestone
Gillingham Anchorians
Horsham
Old Dunstonians
Sheppey
Thanet Wanderers
Uckfield

Teams for 2012-2013
Ashford
Bromley
Folkestone
Gillingham Anchorians
Horsham
Maidstone
Park House
Pulborough
Sheppey
Tunbridge Wells
Uckfield
Vigo

Original teams

When this division was introduced in 2000 (as London 4 South East) it contained the following teams:

Beccehamian - relegated from London 3 South East (10th)
Bognor - promoted from Sussex 1 (champions)
Chichester - relegated from London 3 South East (9th)
Dartfordians - relegated from London 3 South East (10th)
Eastbourne - relegated from London 3 South East (8th)
Folkestone - relegated from London 3 South East (12th)
Heathfield & Waldron - relegated from London 3 South East (11th)
Hove - relegated from London 3 South East (14th)
Old Dunstonians - promoted from Kent 1 (champions)
Park House - relegated from London 3 South East (13th)

London 3 South East honours

London 4 South East (2000–2009)

Originally known as London 4 South East, this division was a tier 8 league with promotion up to London 3 South East and relegation down to either Kent 1 or Sussex 1.

London 3 South East (2009–present)

League restructuring by the RFU ahead of the 2009–10 season saw London 4 South East renamed as London 3 South East.  Remaining as a tier 8 league promotion was to London 2 South East (formerly London 3 South East), while relegation continued to either Kent 1 or Sussex 1.

Number of league titles

Aylesford Bulls (2)
Crowborough (2)
Ashford (1)
Betteshanger (1)
Bognor (1)
Bromley (1)
Chichester (1)
Dartfordians (1)
East Grinstead (1)
Eastbourne (1)
Heathfield & Waldron (1)
Horsham (1)
Maidstone (1)
Old Dunstonians (1)
Old Elthamians (1)
Pulborough (1)
Thanet Wanderers (1)
Tonbridge Juddians (1)

Notes

See also
 Kent RFU
 Sussex RFU
 English rugby union system
 Rugby union in England

References

External links
London 3 South East results at the Rugby Football Union
Sussex Rugby Football Union

8
4